Luke Robert White, 5th Baron Annaly (15 March 1927 – 30 September 1990), was an English first-class cricketer.

Annaly was a good schoolboy cricketer at Eton College and made a century at Lord's for a Public Schools team against a Lord's XI in 1944. He made his first-class debut for an England team in the third of the 1945 Victory Tests against the Australian Services XI, sharing a partnership of 55 with Len Hutton. Annaly played three first-class matches for Middlesex between 1946 and 1947 and made one appearance each for the Marylebone Cricket Club and the Royal Air Force. He also played club cricket for I Zingari.

External links
 Luke White at Cricinfo
 Luke White at Cricket Archive

References

1927 births
1990 deaths
English cricketers
Middlesex cricketers
Royal Air Force cricketers
Marylebone Cricket Club cricketers
I Zingari cricketers
Luke 5